Patricio Ruiloba (born March 28, 1967) is an American politician who has served in the New Mexico House of Representatives for 12th district from 2015 to 2020. He resigned from the House in 2020 to run for sheriff of Bernalillo County, New Mexico. Art De La Cruz was then appointed to serve for the remainder of his term.

References

1967 births
Hispanic and Latino American state legislators in New Mexico
Living people
Democratic Party members of the New Mexico House of Representatives
21st-century American politicians
Politicians from Albuquerque, New Mexico